Westhill High School is a high school located in Stamford, Connecticut, United States. It is located on Roxbury Road, in the northern section of Stamford. Westhill is one of three large public high schools in Stamford, CT, the others being AITE and Stamford High School, the latter being a notable sports rival. A number of public middle schools pool into Westhill High School. Westhill is a diverse high school, representing more than thirty-five distinct nationalities amongst its student body.

Courses
Westhill offers general, college preparatory, honors, and Advanced Placement (AP) classes in the social sciences, the natural sciences, literature, language, and history. Westhill offers language classes including Spanish, French, and Italian. The ECE (Early College Experience) program allows Westhill students to earn credits from the University of Connecticut (UConn) that are transferable to most colleges nationwide. The agriscience program also allows students to take advanced courses that are relevant to the field.

Extracurricular activities and clubs
Westhill High School is home to the Northstar Playmakers, the Mock Trial and Debate Team, over twenty distinct sports teams, and a number of community-service oriented organizations. Westhill participates in the Connecticut Interscholastic Athletic Conference.

Westhill High School’s Boys' Lacrosse team has had several members of the 2011 Varsity team go on to play at Division I schools.

The Westword
In the 2003-2004 academic year, the school newspaper, The Westword launched an online edition.

Notable alumni
 
 Keith Bennett (born 1961), American-Israeli basketball player
 Dave Dresden, EDM DJ and record producer; one half of Gabriel & Dresden
 Pamela Karlan, civil rights lawyer; professor at Stanford University
 Dannel Malloy, governor of Connecticut
 Mark Parker, CEO of Nike
 Bruce Shapiro, journalist; Director of the Dart Center for Journalism and Trauma, Columbia University
 Barry Sternlicht, CEO of Starwood Capital Group; Chairman of Starwood Property Trust (REIT); philanthropist
 David Streitfeld, reporter for The New York Times
 Zach Tyler Eisen, voice actor''

References

External links
 

Education in Stamford, Connecticut
Schools in Fairfield County, Connecticut
Educational institutions established in 1972
Public high schools in Connecticut

https://www.maxpreps.com/m/athlete/chris-kober/8USHXPTxEeKZ5AAmVebBJg/default.htm